Sovereign Soul is a collaborative studio album by American rapper Myka 9 and Canadian producer Factor. It was released on Fake Four Inc. in 2012. Music videos were created for "You Are Free" and "Mind Heights".

Critical reception

Thomas Quinlan of Exclaim! gave the album a 9 out of 10, saying: "While Myka and Factor demonstrated their chemistry three years ago on previous collaboration 1969, Sovereign Soul distills that connection into an even better release." Meanwhile, Adam Maylone of PopMatters gave the album 6 stars out of 10, calling it "one of the most experimental hip hop records I've had the pleasure of hearing in 2012".

Track listing

Personnel
Credits adapted from liner notes.

 Myka 9 – vocals
 Factor – turntables, production, mixing
 Enver Hampton – bass guitar, additional synthesizer (3)
 Levitron – violin (1, 6), guitar (3, 5, 7, 8, 12, 13)
 Kwasi Adisi – trumpet (2, 10)
 Astronautalis – vocals (3)
 Ceschi – vocals (3)
 Abstract Rude – vocals (5)
 Freewill – vocals (5)
 Moka Only – vocals (5)
 Johanna Phraze – vocals (8)
 Jnatural – vocals (8)
 Josef Leimberg – horns (8)
 Jah Orah – vocals (9)
 Charli Rose – vocals (10)
 Open Mike Eagle – vocals (11)
 Mykill Miers – vocals (11)
 Mic King – vocals (11)
 Myk Mansun – vocals (11)
 Erule – vocals (12)
 Jeff Smothers – mastering
 Rachel VonCookie – photography
 319 – design, illustration

References

External links
 
 

2012 albums
Myka 9 albums
Fake Four Inc. albums
Albums produced by Factor (producer)